Sichon is a district (amphoe) of Nakhon Si Thammarat province, southern Thailand.

Geography
The district is in the northern part of the province. Neighboring districts are (from the south clockwise): Tha Sala and Nopphitam of Nakhon Si Thammarat Province; Kanchanadit and Don Sak of Surat Thani province; Khanom of Nakhon Si Thammarat. To the east is the Gulf of Thailand.

Namtok Si Khit National Park is in the district.

Administration
The district is divided into nine sub-districts (tambons), which are further subdivided into 106 villages (mubans). Sichon itself has township (thesaban tambon) status and covers part of tambon Khanom. There are a further nine tambon administrative organizations.

Places of interest
Wat Chedi (วัดเจดีย์): an ancient Buddhist temple more than 1,000 years old in Chalong Subdistrict, this place is famous for "I Khai" (ไอ้ไข่), a wood carving in the shape of a child, aged about 9-10 years old. He is believed to be a local boy who drowned in the temple area and became a Kuman Thong. Each day, many people pay obeisance to him to ask for fortune. Vows are often made to offer cock fighting figures or firecrackers.

References

External links
amphoe.com 
See Sichon - Hidden Gen of a beach near Suratthani

Districts of Nakhon Si Thammarat province